Henry Smythe may refer to:

 Henry A. Smythe (1819–?), American politician
 Henry M. Smythe, American diplomat
 Henry Smythe, a character in the animated Spider-Man series, based on Spencer Smythe